State Road 320 (SR 320) is an east–west route in Levy County connecting Manatee Springs State Park to U.S. Route 19 (US 19), 98, and US 27 Alternate (US 27 Alt.). 

The state-signed portion runs along streets named Manatee Springs Road, Northwest 115th Street, and Northwest 19th Avenue. The road continues east of US 19/98/27 Alt. as County Road 320 along Northeast 120th Street from its intersection with US 19/98/27 Alt. to CR 339 in Newton.

Major intersections

References

External links

320
320
320